FMG may refer to:

Schools
 Father Michael Goetz Secondary School, in Mississauga, Ontario, Canada

Companies
 Flughafen München GmbH, operator of Munich Airport
 Fortescue Metals Group, an Australian mining company
 FMG Insurance, a mutual insurance company in New Zealand
 Forum Media Group, a German publisher
 Fushun Mining Group, a Chinese mining and shale oil extraction company
 FMG Network, Radio, TV & Podcast Network, Est. 2004

Politics and organisations
 Federación de Mocedades Galeguistas, the Galicianist Youth Federation, a defunct Galician nationalist group in Spain
 Film Music Guild, an American student organization

Places
 Flemington railway station, in Sydney, Australia
 Fort Morgan station, in Colorado, United States
 Mainz-Gustavsburg station, in Germany

Other
 Female muscle growth
 Ferromagnetic generator
 Foldable machine gun
 Foreign medical graduate
 Freddie M. Garcia (born 1944), Filipino businessman